Pihlak is an Estonian surname meaning rowan (more common form is Pihlakas).

People bearing the surname Pihlak include:
Arnold Pihlak (1902–1982), football player
 (1888–1944), physician and military commander
Helle Meri (née Pihlak; born 1949), actress and the First Lady
Oskar Pihlak (1901–1968), physician (:et)
Viktor Pihlak (1886–1942), architect and industrialist

References

Estonian-language surnames